Kyrgyzstan Women's League is the top division of women's football in Kyrgyzstan. The league is organized by the Football Federation of Kyrgyz Republic and was established in 2005. Before 1991, some Kyrgyz women's clubs had competed in the Soviet Union women's league system, but after the collapse of the Soviet Union most women's teams left for Russia or simply dissolved. 

As of late 2009 only 6 senior women's football teams existed in Kyrgyzstan, meaning there is no second level league.

Teams
The 2010 season was played by the following 7 teams:

"Abdysh-Ata" (Kant)
"Abdysh-Ata-2" (Karakol)
"Zhyluuluk" (Jalal-Abad)
"Yuzhanka (Osh)
"SDYUSHOR" azalea "(Bishkek)
"Number Bermet" (Karakol)
"Chui" (Chui Province)

Format
The league features six or seven teams per year that play a double round-robin to decide the champion.

Champions
The champions so far are:
2005: El Dorado Altyn-Olko Bishkek
2006: El Dorado Altyn-Olko Bishkek
2007:
2008:
2009:
2010: SDYUSHOR "Azalea" Bishkek)
2011: SDYUSHOR (Bishkek)
2012: Abdysh-Ata (Kant)
2013: Abdysh-Ata
2014: FC RSDYUSHOR (Bishkek)
2015 RSDYUSHOR (Karakol)

See also
 AFC Women's Club Championship

References

External links
 Official website of the KFKR

 
Kyrgyzstan
Women
1